This is a list of gliders/sailplanes of the world, (this reference lists all gliders with references, where available) 
Note: Any aircraft can glide for a short time, but gliders are designed to glide for longer.

By nationality
List of American gliders
List of Argentine gliders
List of Australian gliders
List of Austrian gliders
List of Belgian gliders
List of Brazilian gliders
List of British gliders
List of Bulgarian gliders
List of Canadian gliders
List of Chinese gliders
List of Czechoslovak gliders
List of Danish gliders
List of Dutch gliders
List of Estonian gliders
List of Finnish gliders
List of French gliders
List of German gliders
List of Greek gliders
List of Hungarian gliders
List of Indian gliders
List of Iranian gliders
List of Irish gliders
List of Italian gliders
List of Japanese gliders
List of Latvian gliders
List of Lithuanian gliders
List of New Zealand gliders
List of Philippines gliders
List of Polish gliders
List of Portuguese gliders
List of Romanian gliders
List of Russian/USSR gliders
List of Slovenian gliders
List of South African gliders
List of Spanish gliders
List of Swedish gliders
List of Swiss gliders
List of Turkish gliders
List of Ukrainian gliders
List of Yugoslavian gliders

Notes

Further reading

External links